The  is a professional wrestling tag team championship owned by the Pro-Wrestling Basara promotion, a former DDT Pro-Wrestling sub-brand before it became an independent promotion on January 1, 2020.

Like most professional wrestling championships, the title is won as a result of a scripted match. , there have been nine reigns shared among six different teams consisting of twelve distinctive wrestlers. Aijin Tag (Masato Kamino and Takato Nakano) are the current champions in their second reign both as a team and individually.

History
On October 4, 2019, DDT announced that the third edition of the Basara branded Iron Fist Tag Tournament would crown the first Iron Fist Tag Team Champions. The finals of the tournament took place on October 23, 2019, and saw Iron Priest (Fuma and Yusuke Kubo) defeat Sento Minzoku (Daiki Shimomura and Isami Kodaka) to become the inaugural champions.

Reigns

Combined reigns

By team

By wrestler

See also

Professional wrestling in Japan

References

External links
 IRON FIST Tag Team Championship

DDT Pro-Wrestling championships
Tag team wrestling championships
Pro-Wrestling Basara championships